Camptodactyly is a medical condition that causes one or more fingers or toes to be permanently bent. It involves fixed flexion deformity of the proximal interphalangeal joints.

Camptodactyly can be caused by a genetic disorder. In that case, it is an autosomal dominant trait that is known for its incomplete genetic expressivity. This means that when a person has the genes for it, the condition may appear in both hands, one, or neither. A linkage scan proposed that the chromosomal locus of camptodactyly was 3q11.2-q13.12.

Causes 

The specific cause of camptodactyly remains unknown, but there are a few deficiencies that lead to the condition. A deficient lumbrical muscle controlling the flexion of the fingers, and abnormalities of the flexor and extensor tendons.

A number of congenital syndromes may also cause camptodactyly:
 Jacobsen syndrome
 Beals syndrome
 Blau syndrome
 Freeman–Sheldon syndrome
 Cerebrohepatorenal syndrome
 Weaver syndrome
 Christian syndrome 1
 Gordon syndrome
 Jacobs arthropathy-camptodactyly syndrome
 Lenz microphthalmia syndrome
 Marshall–Smith–Weaver syndrome
 Oculo-dento-digital syndrome
 Tel Hashomer camptodactyly syndrome
 Toriello–Carey syndrome
 Trisomy 13
 Stuve–Wiedemann syndrome
 Loeys–Dietz syndrome
 Fetal alcohol syndrome
 Fryns syndrome
 Marfan syndrome
 Carnio-carpo-tarsal dystrophy

Genetics 

The pattern of inheritance is determined by the phenotypic expression of a gene—which is called expressivity. Camptodactyly can be passed on through generations in various levels of phenotypic expression, which include both or only one hand. This means that the genetic expressivity is incomplete. It can be inherited from either parent.

In most of its cases, camptodactyly occurs sporadically, but it has been found in several studies that it is inherited as an autosomal dominant condition.

Treatment 

If a contracture is less than 30 degrees, it may not interfere with normal functioning. The common treatment is splinting and occupational therapy. Surgery is the last option for most cases as the result may not be satisfactory.

Etymology 
The name is derived from the ancient Greek words kamptos (bent) and daktylos (finger).

See also 

 Clinodactyly

References

External links 
 
 

Congenital disorders
Fingers